"I’m Gonna Be" is a song by American singer Donell Jones. It was written by Jones along with Tim Kelley and Bob Robinson for his fourth studio album Journey of a Gemini (2006), while production was helmed by Kelley under their production moniker Tim & Bob. The song served as the second single from the album and reached number 41 on Billboards Hot R&B/Hip-Hop Songs chart.

Track listings

Charts

References

2006 songs
2006 singles
Donell Jones songs
Songs written by Donell Jones
Songs written by Tim Kelley
Songs written by Bob Robinson (songwriter)
LaFace Records singles
Song recordings produced by Tim & Bob